Judson Worthington Hastings, born on June 13, 1853 in Suffield, Connecticut and died in 1923, was a physician and public official. He served various roles as a physician, trustee of a public library, town clerk, treasurer, tax collector, and a medical inspector of schools. Judson was a part of the Massachusetts Medical Society.

References

1853 births
1923 deaths
Physicians from Connecticut